Clube Futebol Benfica, commonly known as Futebol Benfica, or simply as Fofó, is a Portuguese sports club based in the Benfica neighborhood of Lisbon. The club was founded on 23 March 1933; however, the origins of the club can be traced back to 1895. Futebol Benfica is mostly known for its men's football, women's football, field hockey and roller hockey teams.

The men's football team competes in the Regional league. Previously it competed in the newly created Campeonato Nacional de Seniores, a competition created in 2013 after the merging of the Segunda Divisão and Terceira Divisão (third and fourth tiers of the Portuguese football league system).

The women's football team plays in the national top league, the Campeonato Nacional. Both teams play at the Estádio Francisco Lázaro, where they have been playing ever since the establishment of the club. The home colours are red and black.

Futebol Benfica is an independent club without any affiliation or connection with the better-known Sport Lisboa e Benfica, a neighboring club of much larger dimensions.

History
The existence stretches back to around 1895, as the sports division of a philharmonic society in the parish of Benfica in Lisbon, adopting the name "Foot-Ball de Bemfica" in 1911. It was reorganized as an autonomous club on 23 March 1933. Futebol Benfica has won several national titles, principally in roller hockey and field hockey.

Their pitch is Estádio Francisco Lázaro, on Rua Olivério Serpa, in the parish of Benfica in Lisbon. It is named in honor of the Portuguese athlete, Francisco Lázaro, who died while running in the marathon at the 1912 Summer Olympics in Stockholm.

The club has 3,500 members and approximately 1150 athletes distributed through various sports, including football, women's football, athletics, field hockey, indoor hockey, gymnastics and swimming.

In the 2011–12 season, Futebol Benfica men's football team was promoted to the Segunda Divisão of the Portuguese football after winning the Serie E of the Terceira Divisão, having achieved one of the best results in recent years.

In the 2014–15 season, Futebol Benfica's women's football team won both the Portuguese national women's football league and the Portuguese women's football cup, and went on to also take the first women's supercup.  It won both the national championship and cup again in 2015–16.

Season to season

Honours

Football
 Terceira Divisão
 Winner of Serie E: 2011–12
 AF Lisboa (Regional Leagues)
 First Division of Honour (2): 1994–95, 2004–05
 First Division: 1986–87
 Second Division: 1977–78

Women's football

Portuguese Women's national league
 Champions (2): 2014–15,  2015–16
 Portuguese Women's Football Cup
 Champions (2): 2014–15, 2015–16.
 Runners-up: 2010–11, 2013–14
Supertaça de Portugal de Futebol Feminino
 Champions: 2014–15
 Runners-up: 2015–16

Field Hockey
 Portuguese Field Hockey Championship (8): 1941–42, 1942–43, 1950–51, 1953–54, 1955–56, 1956–57, 1958–59, 1978–79

Roller Hockey
 Portuguese Roller Hockey First Division (3): 1939–40, 1940–41, 1942–43

References

External links
 
 ZeroZero profile & squad 
 ForaDeJogo.net profile & squad
 Women's team at women.soccerway.com

Football clubs in Portugal
Sport in Lisbon
1933 establishments in Portugal
Portuguese field hockey clubs
Sports clubs established in 1933